Egidijus Balčiūnas (born 7 May 1975, in Marijampolė) is a Lithuanian sprint canoer. He won seven medals at the ICF Canoe Sprint World Championships with three golds (K-2 200 m: 2001, 2002, 2003), two silvers (K-2 200 m: 2005, K-2 500 m: 2001), and two bronzes (K-2 500 m: 2003, 2005).

Balčiūnas also competed in four Summer Olympics, earning his best finish of seventh in the K-2 500 m event at Athens in 2004.

Balčiūnas now lives in Vilnius.

References

1975 births
Canoeists at the 2000 Summer Olympics
Canoeists at the 2004 Summer Olympics
Canoeists at the 2008 Summer Olympics
Canoeists at the 2012 Summer Olympics
Lithuanian male canoeists
Living people
Olympic canoeists of Lithuania
ICF Canoe Sprint World Championships medalists in kayak